The 2018 Pocono Green 250 Recycled by J. P. Mascaro & Sons was the 12th stock car race of the 2018 NASCAR Xfinity Series season and the third iteration of the event. The race was held on Saturday, June 2, 2018 in Long Pond, Pennsylvania, at Pocono Raceway, a 2.5 miles (4.0 km) triangular permanent course. The race took the scheduled 100 laps to complete. At race's end, Kyle Busch of Joe Gibbs Racing would dominate and win his 92nd career NASCAR Xfinity Series win and his first of the season. To fill out the podium, Chase Elliott of GMS Racing and Daniel Hemric of Richard Childress Racing would finish second and third, respectively.

Background 

The race was held at Pocono Raceway, which is a three-turn superspeedway located in Long Pond, Pennsylvania. The track hosts two annual NASCAR Sprint Cup Series races, as well as one Xfinity Series and Camping World Truck Series event. Until 2019, the track also hosted an IndyCar Series race.

Pocono Raceway is one of a very few NASCAR tracks not owned by either Speedway Motorsports, Inc. or International Speedway Corporation. It is operated by the Igdalsky siblings Brandon, Nicholas, and sister Ashley, and cousins Joseph IV and Chase Mattioli, all of whom are third-generation members of the family-owned Mattco Inc, started by Joseph II and Rose Mattioli.

Outside of the NASCAR races, the track is used throughout the year by Sports Car Club of America (SCCA) and motorcycle clubs as well as racing schools and an IndyCar race. The triangular oval also has three separate infield sections of racetrack – North Course, East Course and South Course. Each of these infield sections use a separate portion of the tri-oval to complete the track. During regular non-race weekends, multiple clubs can use the track by running on different infield sections. Also some of the infield sections can be run in either direction, or multiple infield sections can be put together – such as running the North Course and the South Course and using the tri-oval to connect the two.

Entry list

Practice

First practice 
The first 50-minute practice session would occur on Friday, June 1, at 1:05 PM EST.

Second and final practice 
The last 50-minute practice session, sometimes referred to as Happy Hour, would occur on Friday, June 1, at 3:05 PM EST.

Qualifying 
Qualifying was held on Saturday, June 2, at 9:35 AM EST. Since Pocono Raceway is at least , the qualifying system was a single car, single lap, two round system where in the first round, everyone would set a time to determine positions 13-40. Then, the fastest 12 qualifiers would move on to the second round to determine positions 1-12.

One driver would fail to qualify: Morgan Shepherd.

Full qualifying results

Race results 
Stage 1 Laps: 25

Stage 2 Laps: 25

Stage 3 Laps: 50

References 

2018 NASCAR Xfinity Series
NASCAR races at Pocono Raceway
June 2018 sports events in the United States
2018 in sports in Pennsylvania